The 2002 K League was the 20th season of the K League. South Korea postponed its football league until July to prepare the 2002 FIFA World Cup, which was hosted by it.

League table

Top scorers

Awards

Main awards

Best XI

Source:

See also
 2002 Korean League Cup
 2002 Korean FA Cup

References

External links
 RSSSF

K League seasons
1
South Korea
South Korea